The 11th Solheim Cup Matches were held August 21–23, 2009 at Rich Harvest Farms in Sugar Grove, Illinois, west of Chicago. The biennial matches are a three-day team competition for professional female golfers, pitting the 12 best players born in the United States against the 12 best players of European nationality.

The United States claimed the Cup for the third consecutive meeting, winning 16–12. Entering the final day, the competition was tied at 8 points each, but the U.S. won eight of the dozen singles matches to retain the Solheim Cup.

Teams
The United States and European teams were selected by different methods.

Team USA qualified by earning points for wins and for top-20 finishes on the LPGA Tour over a two-year period. Points were earned beginning with the 2007 State Farm Classic and concluding with the 2009 Women's British Open. The ten players with the highest points were automatically selected for Team USA. Two additional players were selected by captain Beth Daniel after the conclusion of the Women's British Open on August 2, 2009.

Team Europe was selected by taking the top five players from the LET Solheim Cup standings, followed by the top four European LET members on the Rolex Women’s World Rankings at the agreed cut off date who were not already qualified via The Solheim Cup standings, and three captain’s selections. Qualifying points for Team Europe were awarded weekly to the top-10 finishers at official LET events.

Team USA

*Residence/Hometown according to official 2009 Solheim Cup designation.

Rolex rankings as of August 2, 2009. Rolex ranking does not factor into US Team selection. Shown for comparison purposes only. Lang was 24 on the second day.

Team Europe

*Residence/Hometown according to official Solheim Cup designation.
LET rankings as of August 2, 2009
Rolex rankings as of August 2, 2009

Day one
Friday, August 21, 2009

Morning fourball

Afternoon foursomes

Day two
Sunday, August 22, 2009

Morning fourball

Afternoon foursomes

Day three
Sunday, August 23, 2009

Singles

Individual player records
Each entry refers to the win–loss–half record of the player.

United States

Europe

References

External links
Solheim Cup – official site
GolfCompendium.com: 2009 Solheim Cup

Solheim Cup
Golf in Illinois
Sports competitions in Illinois
Sugar Grove, Illinois
Solheim Cup
Solheim Cup
Solheim Cup
Solheim Cup